Veera Thalattu is a 1998 Indian Tamil-language action drama film written and directed by Kasthuri Raja. The film stars Murali, Vineetha and Khushbu, while Rajkiran, Raadhika and Lakshmi play other supporting roles. The film, which has music by Ilaiyaraaja, released in April 1998.

Cast
Murali as Pandian 
Rajkiran as Pandian's father
Vineetha
Khushbu
Raadhika as Pandian's mother
Lakshmi as Nagalakshmi
Santhana Bharathi
Manivannan
Y. Vijaya
R. Sundarrajan
Shakeela

Production
The film experienced delays in its production, taking over a year and half to complete.

Soundtrack
Music was composed by Ilaiyaraaja, all songs were written by Kasthoori Raja.

Release
The film received mixed reviews upon release, with a critic from Indolink.com noting it was an "old wine in new bottle" and that the director has "attempted to give a new look to the age old story of avenging the death of the hero's father".

References

External links

1998 films
1990s Tamil-language films
Films scored by Ilaiyaraaja
Indian action drama films
Indian films about revenge
Films directed by Kasthuri Raja
1990s action drama films